José Augusto Oliveira de Sousa (born 12 February 1974) is a Portuguese professional darts player. He is based in Tarragona and represented Spain at the 2011 WDF World Cup, but played for the Portuguese team afterwards at the PDC. He won his first televised major title at the 2020 Grand Slam of Darts. He is known among darts fans for his maverick-like scoring, relatively frequent miscounts and unorthodox checkouts in matches.

Career

De Sousa qualified for the 2012 PDC World Darts Championship by winning the Western European qualifier, beating Eduardo Lopes in the final. He became the first Portuguese player to qualify for either version of the World Darts Championship. He lost 4–3 in the preliminary round to South Africa's Devon Petersen. In the rest of the year, he won the Catalonia National Championship and the Catalan Open by beating Antonio Jimenez in the final. De Sousa claimed the 2013 Soft Tip Bullshooter European Championship with a win over Franck Guillermont. He reached the final of the 2015 Catalan Open, but lost 6–1 to Carles Arola.

De Sousa won the 2016 FCD Anniversary Open by overcoming Willem Mandigers 6–1 in the final. In 2017 on the second day of Q School he came close to winning a two-year PDC Tour Card, but lost 5–2 to Royden Lam in the final round.

2019
After a first round defeat at the 2019 PDC World Darts Championship to Michael Barnard, De Sousa went to PDC European Q-School in January 2019 and won a Tour Card for the first time, finishing sixth on the Order of Merit to seal at least two years on the PDC ProTour.

He made gradual improvements throughout his first year on tour, and made his maiden PDC final at Players Championship 18, but lost 8–5 to James Wade. De Sousa then became the first Portuguese player to win a PDC title at Players Championship 23. He beat Peter Wright 7–3 in the semi-finals and Gerwyn Price 8–1 in the final.

2020
At the 2020 PDC World Darts Championship he lost 3–0 to Damon Heta in the first round.

In March, De Sousa made his debut at the 2020 UK Open, but lost to Welsh youngster Lewy Williams 6–4 in the third round.

In 2020, De Sousa won his first PDC European Tour title, beating the number 1 ranked player Michael Van Gerwen in the final 8–4, averaging 105,79. His winning checkout was an unorthodox 88 finish of treble 8, double 14, double 18, and with that victory followed the winners prize of £25,000. Two weeks later in the 2020 European Championship, De Sousa managed to hit his first ever televised nine-darter, in a 6–3 win over Jeffrey de Zwaan. Portugal was not on the entry list for 2020 PDC World Cup of Darts, but Singapore withdrew from the competition as Harith Lim couldn't fly to Austria. They were replaced by Portugal (represented by de Sousa and José Marquês) and together they defeated team Hungary in the first round 5–0, however, in the second round they lost to team Austria.

Continuing a good run of form, De Sousa won his first major title in the 2020 Grand Slam of Darts. After beating Krzysztof Ratajski and Lisa Ashton in the group stages, he then defeated Dave Chisnall, avenged a group stage defeat to Michael Smith in the quarter-finals, beat Simon Whitlock in the semi-finals, then he defeated James Wade in the final 16–12, winning with a 158 checkout. De Sousa became the first ever Portuguese winner of a major tournament, and broke into the world's Top 16 by winning the event.

2021
De Sousa qualified for 2021 PDC World Darts Championship via PDC Order of Merit as 14th seed. He defeated Ross Smith in the second round 3–1, but lost 0–4 to Mervyn King in the third round, despite averaging 103.62. He finished the year in 15th place in the PDC Order of Merit and secured his tour card, and was named as one of the 10 competitors in the 2021 Premier League Darts.

2022
At the 2022 PDC World Darts Championship De Sousa lost 3–4 to Alan Soutar in the third round.

World Championship results

PDC
 2012: Preliminary round (lost to Devon Petersen 3–4 (legs))
 2019: First round (lost to Michael Barnard 2–3)
 2020: First round (lost to Damon Heta 0–3)
 2021: Third round (lost to Mervyn King 0–4)
 2022: Third round (lost to Alan Soutar 3–4)
 2023: Fourth round (lost to Gerwyn Price 1–4)

Career finals

PDC major finals: 2 (1 title, 1 runner-up)

Performance timeline

 

PDC European Tour

Nine-dart finishes

Notes

References

External links
José de Sousa player profile at Darts Orakel

1974 births
Living people
Portuguese darts players
Portuguese expatriate sportspeople in Spain
Professional Darts Corporation current tour card holders
PDC ranking title winners
Grand Slam of Darts champions
Darts players who have thrown televised nine-dart games
PDC World Cup of Darts Portuguese team
Sportspeople from Lisbon District
21st-century Portuguese people